Ivan Wilkerson Johnson (born April 10, 1984) is an American former professional basketball player. He played college basketball for Cisco College, L.A. Southwest JC, Oregon and Cal State San Bernardino.

Johnson is currently playing in the 3-on-3 basketball league BIG3 playing for Ghost Ballers.

College career
Johnson played college basketball for four different colleges including Cisco Junior College in Texas and Los Angeles Southwest Junior College, where he averaged 22.3 points, 12.2 rebounds and 2.4 blocks per game as a sophomore.  He then transferred to the University of Oregon on a scholarship.

Professional career

NBA D-League and Korean Basketball League (2007–2010)
Johnson began his professional career in the NBA D-League where he played for the Anaheim Arsenal and Rio Grande Valley Vipers from 2007-2008. After that, he played in the Korean Basketball League (KBL) with the Changwon LG Sakers and Jeonju KCC Egis from 2008-2010. He was "banned forever" from the KBL for directing the middle-finger gesture at a referee during the final game of the championship series. After the game, the KBL held a meeting and also decided to fine Johnson US$4,448.

Atlanta Hawks (2011–2012)
On December 9, 2011, Johnson signed with the Atlanta Hawks.  On April 13, 2012, Johnson was sent home and fined an undisclosed amount of money for "conduct detrimental to the team."  Just three days later on April 16, 2012, Johnson scored a career high 21 points against the Toronto Raptors.

On May 12, 2012, the NBA fined Johnson $25,000 for gesturing, again with his middle finger, at a Boston Celtics fan following the Hawks’ elimination from the playoffs.

On September 18, 2012, Johnson signed a one-year deal to return to the Atlanta Hawks.

Zhejiang Golden Bulls (2013)
In August 2013, Johnson signed with the Zhejiang Golden Bulls in China.

Brief return to Dallas (2014)
On July 29, 2014, Johnson signed with the Dallas Mavericks. However, he was later waived by the Mavericks on October 25, 2014. On December 5, 2014, he was acquired by the Texas Legends of the NBA Development League. On February 6, 2015, he was waived by Texas.

Talk 'N Text (2015)
On February 18, 2015, Johnson signed with Talk 'N Text Tropang Texters of the Philippine Basketball Association. On April 29, 2015, he helped the Texters to win the 2015 PBA Commissioner's Cup.

RETAbet.es GBC (2015)
In September 2015, Johnson signed with RETAbet.es GBC of Spain for the 2015–16 season. Though, in October he had to leave the team.

Return to Talk 'N Text / Tropang TNT (2016)
On January 13, 2016, Johnson signed once again with the defending champion Tropang TNT as the team's import for the 2016 PBA Commissioner's Cup. Days before the Commissioner's Cup, he was figured in a brawl with two players of Blackwater Elite in the team's tune-up game in Moro Lorenzo Gym. Johnson was suspended for one game and fined 50,000 pesos after the incident.

On February 13, 2016, Johnson was "banned for life" from the PBA and fined 250,000 pesos after he disrespected and cursed the PBA commissioner Chito Narvasa during their game against Meralco Bolts, earlier in the game he was called for a technical foul for second motion on Meralco's Forward/Center Kelly Nabong and a flagrant foul one penalty after he gave an elbow to the face of Meralco's Forward/Center Bryan Faundo and his second technical foul came from his encounter with the commissioner Narvasa that led him to be ejected from the game.

Johnson, through his Twitter account, later apologized to Commissioner Narvasa and thanked the PBA for giving him the chance to return as the import of the Tropang TNT for the second consecutive time. In a press conference, Narvasa accepted Johnson's apology, three days after the incident. The PBA later downgraded the ban order to a suspension good for one season and the fine has been reduced to 150,000 pesos.

Petrochimi Bandar Imam / Caciques de Humacao (2016)
On March 9, 2016, Johnson signed with Petrochimi Bandar Imam of the Iranian Super League. However, he never played for the Iranian team. On April 25, he left Petrochimi and signed with Caciques de Humacao for a second stint.

Hekmeh/Sagesse (2016)
On December 12, 2016, Johnson signed with Sagesse of the Lebanese Basketball League.

Alab Pilipinas (2017)
After a stint in the BIG3, Johnson returned to professional, 5-on-5 basketball after being signed by the Alab Pilipinas of the ASEAN Basketball League as its new World Import. This will be Johnson's third stint playing in the Philippines.

NBA career statistics

Regular season

|-
| style="text-align:left;"| 
| style="text-align:left;"| Atlanta
| 56 || 0 || 16.7 || .513 || .333 || .720 || 4.0 || .6 || .8 || .3 || 6.4
|-
| style="text-align:left;"| 
| style="text-align:left;"| Atlanta
| 69 || 5 || 15.0 || .520 || .077 || .618 || 3.9 || .7 || .8 || .2 || 6.6
|-
| style="text-align:left;"| Career
| style="text-align:left;"| 
| 125|| 5 || 15.8 || .517 || .158 || .662 || 3.9 || .6 || .8 || .3 || 6.5

Playoffs

|-
| style="text-align:left;"| 2012
| style="text-align:left;"| Atlanta
| 5 || 0 || 10.8 || .313 || .000 || .600 || 3.4 || .0 || .6 || .0 || 2.6
|-
| style="text-align:left;"| 2013
| style="text-align:left;"| Atlanta
| 6 || 0 || 18.0 || .462 || .000 || .667 || 3.3 || .5 || .7 || .5 || 6.0
|-
| style="text-align:left;"| Career
| style="text-align:left;"| 
| 11 || 0 || 14.7 || .405 || .000 || .652 || 3.4 || .3 || .6 || .3 || 4.5

Personal life
Johnson has been in a relationship with Ivelisse Ramos Esquilin. They reside together in San Antonio, Texas with her children.

References

External links
NBA.com Profile 
ESPN.com Profile
Oregon Ducks bio

1984 births
Living people
African-American basketball players
American expatriate basketball people in China
American expatriate basketball people in the Dominican Republic
American expatriate basketball people in the Philippines
American expatriate basketball people in South Korea
American expatriate basketball people in Spain
American men's basketball players
Anaheim Arsenal players
Atlanta Hawks players
Basketball players from San Antonio
Big3 players
Caciques de Humacao players
Cal State San Bernardino Coyotes men's basketball players
Changwon LG Sakers players
Cisco College alumni
Erie BayHawks (2008–2017) players
Gipuzkoa Basket players
Jeonju KCC Egis players
Junior college men's basketball players in the United States
Oregon Ducks men's basketball players
Philippine Basketball Association imports
Power forwards (basketball)
Qingdao Eagles players
Rio Grande Valley Vipers players
San Miguel Alab Pilipinas players
Texas Legends players
TNT Tropang Giga players
Undrafted National Basketball Association players
Zhejiang Golden Bulls players
Sagesse SC basketball players
21st-century African-American sportspeople
20th-century African-American people
American men's 3x3 basketball players